Mohammed Emhamed Awad Najm (1943 – 13 December 2016), also transliterated as Muhammad Nejm, was a Libyan major and political figure. He was one of the original twelve members of the Libyan Revolutionary Command Council and also served as Foreign Minister.

Biography 
Born and raised in Benghazi, Najm graduated from the Benghazi Military University Academy in 1963, where he met Muammar Gaddafi. He was a leading figure in the 1969 Libyan coup d'état that overthrew King Idris and brought Gaddafi to power. In addition to being part of the Libyan Revolutionary Command Council (RCC), he also served as chairman of the court in the trial of former Minister of Defense, Lieutenant Colonel Adam al‐Hawaz, and former Minister of Interior, Lieutenant Colonel Ahmed Moussa, who was accused of plotting a coup to overthrow the RCC, in April 1970.

Najm served as Minister of Foreign Affairs and Unity from October 1970 to February 1972. He then played a leading role in Gaddafi's Cultural Revolution, partaking in activities such as leading a "People's Committee" of youth to seize a radio station in Tripoli.

Despite the fact that Najm was not implicated in Umar Muhayshi's attempted coup against Gaddafi in August 1975, the military purge in the aftermath led to Najm being excluded from the RCC.

After a series of disagreements with Gaddafi, Najm withdrew from politics in the late 1970s and lived as an ordinary citizen in his hometown of Benghazi. In May 2002, he was involved in a car accident and fractured one of his spine vertebrae. He subsequently spent a long time undergoing treatment and rehabilitation in Switzerland. During the First Libyan Civil War in July 2011, it was reported that Najm had defected to the National Transitional Council.

Najm went to Tunisia for medical treatment in late 2016 and died in a hospital in Tunis on 13 December 2016.

References 

1943 births
2016 deaths
Foreign ministers of Libya
People of the First Libyan Civil War